The Best of Luther Vandross... The Best of Love is the first compilation album by American singer Luther Vandross, released on October 4, 1989. It contains two previously unreleased songs, "Here and Now"—which became Vandross' first top ten pop hit and won the Grammy Award for "Best R&B Vocal Performance, Male" in 1991—and the 1990 US #5 R&B single "Treat You Right".

Track listing

Disc one

Disc two

Notes
 "If This World Were Mine" is a Marvin Gaye & Tammi Terrell cover (1967)
 "A House Is Not a Home" is a Dionne Warwick cover (1964)
 "Since I Lost My Baby" is a cover by The Temptations (1965)
 "If Only for One Night" is a Brenda Russell cover (1979)
 "Creepin'" is a Stevie Wonder cover (1977)
 "Superstar" is a Delaney & Bonnie cover (1969)
 "Until You Come Back to Me (That's What I'm Gonna Do)" is an Aretha Franklin cover (1973)
 "Love Won't Let Me Wait" is a Major Harris cover (1975)

Charts

Weekly charts

Year-end charts

Certifications

References 

1989 greatest hits albums
Epic Records compilation albums
Luther Vandross compilation albums
Albums produced by Luther Vandross
Albums produced by Marcus Miller